Kingdom is a 2019 South Korean period horror streaming television series, created and written by Kim Eun-hee and based on the webtoon series The Kingdom of the Gods (신의나라:버닝헬) by writer Kim Eun-hee and artist Yang Kyung-il. As Netflix's first original Korean series, it premiered on January 25, 2019. It stars Ju Ji-hoon, Ryu Seung-ryong, Bae Doo-na, Kim Sang-ho, Kim Sung-kyu and Kim Hye-jun. The entire first season, and the first episode of the second were directed by Kim Seong-hun, with Park In-je directing the remainder of that season.

Set in the 16th century and three years after the end of the Imjin War, Kingdom takes place in a fictional, medieval-inspired Joseon (modern-day Korea) and blends political thriller and elements from zombie horror. The story follows Lee Chang, the Crown Prince of Joseon, who attempts to investigate the mysterious illness recently afflicting the King, only to find himself caught in the middle of a deadly epidemic ravaging the Kingdom of Joseon. While trying to save the Kingdom from the plague, he must also stop his political opponents from seizing the throne.

The series was positively reviewed, and renewed for a second season which was released on March 13, 2020. A special feature-length episode of the series, titled "Ashin of the North", was released on July 23, 2021, presenting a focus on the supporting character played by Jun Ji-hyun. The episode acts as a sidequel to the second season of Kingdom and explores the backstory of Ashin, the mysterious character Lee Chang's group encountered on their journey north to discover the origins of the infected.

Synopsis
Set during Korea's Joseon Dynasty, three years after the Imjin War, the first season of Kingdom follows the story of Crown Prince Lee Chang and his subordinates, who stumble across an unnatural plague that resurrects the dead amidst their investigation of a brewing political conspiracy and rumors of the King of Joseon's death. Amidst the chaos and death that ensues, Chang meets allies who try to make a stand in the city-state of Sangju before it spreads further into the province, only to discover that the plague has already adapted. The second season picks up during Lee Chang's struggle to save his people from the spread of the plague and his dynasty from the machinations of the powerful Haewon Cho clan who hides a sinister secret.

Kingdom: Ashin of the North 

Kingdom: Ashin of the North explores the backstory of Ashin, the mysterious heir of the Northern Seongjeoyain tribe village, and the origin of the resurrection plant  that triggered an unprecedented cascade of tragic events that swept through the Kingdom of Joseon.

Plot

Kingdom is set during Korea's Joseon period, three years after the famous "Battle of Unpo Wetland" near the city of Sangju during the Japanese invasions of Korea, where 500 Korean soldiers, led by Governor Ahn Hyeon, defeated an army of 30,000 Japanese invaders. Unbeknownst to the common people, this victory was achieved by using an herb known as the "resurrection plant", which transformed the diseased villagers of Sumang into ferocious zombies; after the battle ended, the zombies were executed and buried in secret.

Season One

At the start of the series, the King dies of smallpox. Chief State Councillor Lord Cho Hak-ju decides to hide the King's death until his daughter, Queen Consort Cho, produces a son. Such a son would have a more legitimate claim to the throne than Crown Prince Lee Chang, whose mother was a concubine. As a result, the King is inoculated with the resurrection plant and subsequently becomes a monster at night, restrained with chains and fed with the bodies of court servants. Refused permission to visit his father, the Prince leaves in disguise to search for Lee Seung-hui, the doctor who last treated the King. Shocked by what he finds in the process of investigating the King's illness, he heads to the Southern province of Gyeongsang with his loyal bodyguard Mu-yeong to search for more answers. At Lee Seung-hui's clinic outside the city of Dongnae, physician's assistant Seo-bi cares for dozens of patients, but is running out of food to feed them. Yeong-shin, one of the patients, makes a stew for the people from what he says is deer meat. However, the meat is later revealed to be from the cadaver of someone bitten by the King and all the patients quickly turn into zombies.

The next day, the magistrate of Dongnae and nephew of Lord Cho Hak-ju, Cho Beom-pal, disregards Seo-bi and Yeong-shin's advice to cut off the head of each cadaver, leading to a night of chaos when the dead awaken. When the Prince takes control and orders that the bodies of the undead be destroyed, the yangbans secretly flee on the only boat, carrying their belongings and the corpse of a precious son. Soldiers of the royal guard from Hanyang confront the Prince, resulting in the slaughter of dozens of civilians he was trying to help. Subsequently, the Prince goes to Sangju to seek help from Lord Ahn Hyeon, his mentor. Investigating a village that seems to be oddly well-fed in such dire times, he discovers the fate of the missing boat; the precious son became a monster, the yangbans were killed or drowned, and the boat was looted after stranding itself. Awakened from his retreat by his own alarm network, Lord Ahn Hyeon arrives with troops who know how to deal with the zombie crisis. The season ends with Queen Cho taking the Regency of the vacant throne, decreeing the blockade of the South, while Lord Cho Hak-ju comes to Gyeongsang's gate with the Army and the zombie King. On the other side, Lord Ahn Hyeon and the Prince fortify Sangju against the zombies while Seo-bi and Cho Beom-pal explore the Frozen Valley, learning the origins of the zombie disease.

Season Two

In Hanyang, the Queen has gathered many pregnant women at Naeseonjae, her private residence. Mu-yeong's wife is there as well, taken as a hostage, to force Mu-yeong to spy on the Prince. The pregnant women are killed when their delivery is not as expected. As a result, the Special Forces Commander becomes suspicious and searches Naeseonjae. He finds the corpses of seven delivered women. The baby girls were strangled, but the baby boys were only stillborn. At Sangju, it is discovered that the zombies are slowed not by sunlight, but by temperature. Since the weather gets colder, the situation becomes worse after another night of chaos. The Prince decides to break into the border fortress with a limited squad. They are successful, but fall into a trap. Lord Ahn Hyeon is shot to death, while The Prince is put in the presence of the zombie King, and must cut his head off to save his own life. But there was a trap inside the trap; when Lord Cho Hak-ju turns back to Hanyang, Lord Ahn Hyeon appears as a resurrected zombie. Wearing his commanding flag, he bites Lord Cho Hak-ju, before being killed himself, proving the existence of zombies and the good faith of the Prince. The blockade army allies with The Prince.

The next day, Lord Cho Hak-ju's corpse disappears. He has been taken by Mu-yeong, helped by Seo-bi and Cho Beom-pal. They flee toward Hanyang, but along the way Mu-yeong is killed. At the Lord Cho Hak-ju's residence, Seo-bi discovers a cure; a full immersion in water forces away the worm-like entities causing the zombification. At the same time, the Queen pretends to give birth, presenting Mu-yeong's wife's newborn as her own. She poisons her recovered father who discovered the lie, and organizes a zombie research lab beneath her Palace. While the Queen prepares a large proscription, the Royal Guards are lured out of the Palace, allowing the Crown Prince to conquer the place. But the Queen practices a scorched earth policy and orders to release the zombies from the research lab, and chaos ensues. However, the plan of closing the gates of the inner Palace is not sufficient, and the Queen is eaten. The last few survivors escape to the Rear Garden and break the ice of the pond. The zombies are stopped by the water, while the bitten but not yet transformed people are saved from being zombified.

Seven years later, the baby is crowned King, while Seo-bi, Yeong-shin and the former Crown Prince investigate the Northern Provinces. Shortly after their arrival to a seemingly empty village, a mysterious woman named Ashin appears inside a barn, and stands next to the undead kept inside wooden boxes for some nefarious purpose.

Ashin of the North

Set before the events of the first season, the episode delves into Ashin's origin story and her experiences growing into a scorned woman that turned against the Kingdom of Joseon. During her childhood, Ashin lived in the Northern village of Seongjeoyain with her ailing mother, and her father, Ta Hab who was one of the Jurchen people living in Joseon and also the head of their settlement. Tensions were high between Joseon, the central kingdom, and the Jurchen border tribes of Pajeowi. The Pajeowi had gathered their army at the basin of the Pajero River.

When fifteen of Pajeowi Jurchen men enter the forbidden area known as Pyesa-gun to illegally gather wild ginseng, they all die unexpectedly. It is revealed that Cho Beom-il, a high-ranking member of the Haewon Cho clan, orchestrated the deaths of the Jurchen men. The Deputy Commander of the Chupajin group, Min Chi-rok was tasked to investigate the deaths of the Jurchen. After discovering Cho's involvement in the killings at Pyesa-gun, he travels to the Seongjeoyain village to conduct damage control and prevent a conflict against the Kingdom by the Pajeowi. Later, Min Chi-rok spreads the message that the deaths were due to a tiger attack but some villagers remained skeptical.

During a meeting with Ta Hab, the Commander requests him to travel to the bordering Pajeowi tribe and spread the message, that the attack was caused by a tiger who killed the men. Ta Hab agreed to the mission as he had pledged his loyalty to Joseon and hoping his actions will grant Seongjeoyain governmental representation, improving the lives of its people. This was later revealed to be a ruse conspired by the Commander, to strategically protect the interests of the Kingdom.

On a false hunt for the alleged tiger, the Commander encounters some Pajeowi soldiers and informs the group, that the attackers of the Pajeowi men were killed by the villagers of Seongjeoyain. This act later diverts the Pajeowi 's hostility towards the village of Seongjeoyain. Afterwards, the Pajeowi military led by Ai Da Gan, attacks Seongjeoyain in the middle of the night, massacring the inhabitants. Prior to the attack on the village, Ashin finds the resurrection plant in a hidden cave shrine and reads the ancient mural to understand its properties and effects, to tend to her terminally ill mother. Upon returning to the village, she finds that it has been burned to the ground and all the villagers killed. Unbeknownst to Ashin, her father was taken hostage by the Pajeowi military.

Being the sole survivor of the massacre, Ashin goes to the Commander and begs for a chance to avenge her family. He places her in a military settlement post, where she begins to perform odd jobs and gets sexually abused by the soldiers, while training in the woodlands. Years later, she was told by the Commander to spy on the military camp of Pajeowi. While infiltrating the camp, Ashin finds her father held as a prisoner, with his limbs amputated. Ta Hab begs his daughter to kill him to end his misery. Ashin complies and sets the camp on fire before going back to the settlement. Prior to her return to the military settlement, the Commander was summoned to return to the South to deal with the war against the Japanese forces, leaving his Second-in-command and soldiers behind. Soon after, Ashin reads the records inside the Commander's hut, implicating the Commander in framing the Seongjeoyain village for the Jurchen deaths' at Pyesa-gun, leading to the eventual massacre of her village.

Ashin prepares to take revenge against the Kingdom of Joseon. After night falls, she kills several Joseon soldiers as they sleep and uses the resurrection plant to bring them back as zombies. While the zombies rampage around the camp, Ashin kills any soldiers, with her bow and arrows, who manage to escape or lock themselves beyond the zombies' reach. Using the last soldier as bait, she attracted the zombies together and then burns them, effectively killing all the soldiers and zombies in the camp. Ashin is then seen dragging a giant sack back to her village which looks normal. She then enters her old house which was filled with her family and some villagers. She was awakened to zombie snarls which brings her to the present where the village is burned down and the house is filled with zombies chained to the back of the house. It is revealed that after the massacre of her village, she had converted her family and some villagers into zombies. Ashin had been feeding them animals for years but felt that they deserved better food and fed them a kidnapped soldier she had carried with her in the sack. She vowed to destroy Joseon and the Jurchen to avenge them and joined them when she is done.

Ashin leaves to meet Lee Seung-hui, the Joseon King's physician at the border in Uiji. She sells him the resurrection plant, setting in motion the events that would later occur in the "Battle of Unpo Wetland" and the tragedy that would come to pass at Dongnae. After exiting the city, Ashin walks into an open field, and later witnesses Ai Da Gan and his Pajeowi brethren riding horses in the distance. The Pajeowi riders approach Ashin and she shoots an arrow without hesitation.

Cast

Main 
 Ju Ji-hoon as Lee Chang, the Crown Prince of Joseon and heir presumptive to the throne. Although he is the King's only child, his late mother was unmarried, meaning that a son born from the Queen Consort would become the heir apparent and new Crown Prince. Suspicious of the illness afflicting the King, and his recent lack of public appearances, his investigation not only uncovers a dangerous plague that brings the dead back to life, but also a plot to betray the Royal family and usurp him as heir.
 Ryu Seung-ryong as Lord Cho Hak-ju (seasons 1–2), the Chief State Councilor of Joseon who is the head of the Haewon Cho clan and Lee Chang's political rival. He is the father of Queen Consort Cho and Cho Beom-il, and the uncle of Cho Beom-pal. A cold, ruthless leader, he is desperate to secure his power over the throne through Queen Cho's unborn child who he seeks to make heir to the throne in place of Lee Chang.
 Bae Doona as Seo-bi, a physician from Dongnae, and one of the only two survivors of the plague's original outbreak. She desperately seeks to find a cure, and comes to possess a journal containing crucial information about the disease.
 Kim Sung-kyu as Yeong-shin, a mysterious tiger hunter from the South who is the other survivor of the first outbreak. A skilled fighter uniquely skilled with European muskets and who shares little of his past, he allies himself with Lee Chang and helps to lead the fight against the undead.
 Jeon Seok-ho as Cho Beom-pal, a magistrate of Dongnae and Cho Hak-ju's nephew, shown to have somewhat of a good nature but to be incompetent and easily scared.
 Kim Hye-jun as Queen Consort Cho (seasons 1–2), the young and pregnant Queen of Joseon, and the King's wife. She is Cho Hak-ju's daughter, Cho Beom-il's sister and Lee Chang's stepmother. Like her father, she is desperate to secure her power over the throne by giving birth to a son that will displace Crown Prince Lee Chang as the rightful heir.
 Kim Sang-ho as Mu-yeong (seasons 1–2), Prince Chang's loyal personal bodyguard who accompanies him to the southern provinces to investigate the plague, leaving his pregnant wife in the capital.
 Huh Joon-ho as Lord Ahn Hyeon (regular season 1; recurring season 2), a former governor considered a war hero for his part in the Imjin War. Despite his popularity with the people, he retired from public service to live a quiet life in Sangju. He was also a mentor to the young Lee Chang.
 Jun Ji-hyun as Ashin (guest season 2; main in special), a mysterious woman from the Hamgyong Province in the North of the country.
 Kim Si-a as young Ashin (special)
 Park Byung-eun as Min Chi-rok (recurring season 2; main in special), head of the Royal Commandery and a skilled archer who becomes suspicious of the Queen.
 Koo Kyo-hwan as Ai Da Gan (special), the Leader of the nomadic Pajeowi tribe.
 Kim Roi-ha as Ta Hab (special), Ashin's father and head of the Northern Seongjeoyain tribe.

Recurring
 Jung Suk-won as Cho Beom-il (seasons 1–2; special), Cho-Hak-ju's son and Queen Cho's elder brother and a commander in the Royal Army.
 Kim Jong-soo as Kim Sun, Chief Scholar in Hanyang who clashes with Cho Hak-ju.
 Kwon Bum-taek as Lee Seung-hui (season 1; special), the Royal physician who attends to the King.
 Lee Yang-hee as the Minister of War: Powerful politician in Hanyang who is initially loyal to the Haewon Cho clan but finds his loyalty wavering.
 Jin Seon-kyu as Deok Sung: Ahn Hyeon's loyal right-hand man.
 Jeon Su-ji as Ashin's mother: She died when Ashin was a child.
 Joo Suk-tae as Lee Do-jin (seasons 1–2), leader of the Palace Guard who travels south to apprehend Lee Chang. He is loyal to Cho Hak-ju.
 Ahn Eun-jin as Mu-yeong's wife, who is pregnant and was put under the protection of the Haewon Cho clan. 
 Kim Tae-hoon as Lee Gang-yun (season 2), head of the Royal Army, who travels south with Cho Hak-ju.
 Jo Han-chul as Won Yu (season 2), descendant of an exiled member of the royal family living a quiet life on remote island, who is sought out by Lee Chang.
 Ahn Jae-hong as Eunuch (season 2), a former eunuch who later becomes the new king's servant.
 Kim Kang-hoon as King Yi Yeom (season 2), Mu-yeong's son who was rescued from a horde of zombies as a baby by Seo-bi.

Episodes

Series overview

Season 1 (2019)

Season 2 (2020)

Special (2021)

Production

Development
Netflix approached Eun-hee, after Signal ended its run, to work on a future project that she could helm. After successfully pitching the concept of the show, Netflix agreed to the proposition and committed to a series order announcement. On March 5, 2017, Netflix announced that it had given the production a series order for a first season. Alongside the series announcement, it was confirmed that Kim Seong-hun would direct the series and that Kim Eun-hee would be credited as the writer. Production companies involved with the series were slated to consist of AStory. Even before the release of the first season, Netflix announced that they would be making a second season. Filming for the second season started in February 2019, with Director Park In-je joining the production to direct its second episode and onward. In November 2020, production for a one-off special episode Kingdom: Ashin of the North was confirmed, with season one director Kim Seong-hun returning and Kim Eun-hee reprising her role as screenwriter.

The series overspent the budget, with each episode costing more than $1.78 million. As a result, the first two seasons, which were originally planned to have eight episodes each, were shortened to six episodes.

On January 16, 2018, a crew member of the art team died due to overwork. On March 14, 2019, it was confirmed that in the midst of filming the second season, a staff member in the production team died after a car accident. On January 7, 2021, a castle on the filming set of Kingdom: Ashin of the North caught fire as a staff member attempted to melt the snow using a torch lamp. Parts of the castle were destroyed in the process of extinguishing the fire, and there were no resulting injuries.

Writing

Screenwriter Kim Eun-hee began thinking about the story behind the series in 2011, wanting to reflect the fears and anxiety of modern times through the lens of the historical Joseon period. Originally, the creator thought it would be difficult to portray the story in a television series format, and instead created the webcomic The Kingdom of the Gods alongside illustrator Yang Kyung-il in 2014. While the series is adapted from the webcomic, they do not share much commonality other than their basic concepts.

Whilst working on television series, Phantom and Signal, Eun-hee continued to work on the project but encountered challenges in writing a period piece and securing investments for the project. Born out of an interest to explore opportunities for writing in a diverse range of genres and not limited by conventional choices in storytelling and censorship in publicly broadcast K-dramas, Eun-hee credited the success of Train to Busan, as the turning point for the revitalization of the interest in zombie films in the Korean media space.

In an online interview, Eun-hee stated that politics is integrated to the core of the series, noting that "It's about what politics is. Flawed politics created resentment, and there will be a consequence of gaining the plant that brings dead people to life". She added that the political environment drives many of the decisions, and propels the actions of characters in their journey, highlighting that "If we go deeper and deeper, it all boils down to politics. The pain that comes from politics, the price we have to pay for pain, they are the message that penetrates the series." Eun-hee further spoke about the importance of blending those genres and particularly focusing on the examination of the political elements covered in the series, citing that "politics and the living dead are not separate, but they rather come together as one." Adding to that, Eun-hee commented about the nature of politics, and its role in shaping the world of Kingdom. The series’ portrayal of political dynamics of corruption and power highlights the disparity of growing concerns against the bourgeoise, suffering in the midst of a plague. Speaking on the conceptualization of the plague, the creator argued its role in the narrative is to serve as a reflection of the corruption, greed, inequity and injustice committed by the ruling class, using it as a camouflage to usurp the political power to maintain influence in the Kingdom of Joseon.

Eun-hee stated in an interview that she wanted to depict several themes through the use of various narrative devices in the series. She later explained that the theme of the first season was "to tell a story about hunger." Eun-hee further added that she wanted to "portray people who were mistreated by those in power struggling with starvation and poverty through the monsters". Shifting to the second season, the theme of blood was explored to "tell a story about monsters who crave blood and humans who desire a particular bloodline and lineage." Later, Eun-hee noted that a future season of Kingdom will dabble in the exploration of resentment as a theme for the basis of the new story to be told.

After Netflix ordered the special episode Kingdom: Ashin of the North, Eun-hee highlighted that the episode will mark an important bridge between the events of the first two seasons and the third season. In an interview, Eun-hee elucidated further on the reasoning behind the episode, stating that "I decided to go with a special episode because I thought it would be more interesting. We cannot leave out the story of the resurrection plant." She further added that "If the first season served as the cornerstone of the show, Kingdom: Ashin of the North, will be a stepping stone for the third season of Kingdom." In an interview with The Philippine Star, Kim Eun-hee discussed the significance of exploring the concept of Han in the special episode. Whilst the creator began to delve into the idea through the creation of Ashin's character when writing the second season, Kim Eun-hee wanted to further examine the collective trauma, grief and resentment born from the experiences of tragedy in the special episode. The writer expressed her desire in depicting Han in the story, stating that "I always wanted to write a story about the feeling of Han. And in the previous seasons, it’s usually focused on the dominating power such as Prince Chang and the established people who lead the story. And then I came to think of the northern part of Joseon and the ones who are actually dominated by these people. So regardless of whether it is Joseon or another country, I think the people who are dominated have that same feeling (of Han)."

Filming
Principal photography for the first two seasons took place on location in Seoul, South Korea, including the Gyeonggi Province and North Gyeongsang Province between 2018 and 2019. Filming for Kingdom: Ashin of the North took place in Jeju Island in 2020.

Casting
Actor Song Joong-ki was courted for the lead role but declined. In September 2017, it was reported that Ju Ji-hoon, Ryu Seung-ryong, and Bae Doo-na were in talks to star in the series. In November 2019, it was reported that Jun Ji-hyun would star in the second season. After the announcement for the special episode, it was confirmed that Jun Ji-hyun and Park Byung-eun would reprise their respective roles in Kingdom: Ashin of the North. Additionally, it was confirmed that Kim Shi-ah, Koo Kyo-hwan and Kim Roi-ha were cast in the special episode.

Prior to the premiere of the second season, Joo Ji-hoon stated in a Forbes interview, that he signed on to star in the series, due to his faith in the project. He adds that "From the refreshing subject matter to writer Kim Eun-hee’s exciting script, direction by director Kim Sung-hoon—and the cast members from season one—all these factors convinced me to continue on the journey to season two". Furthermore, he was excited at the prospect of a new director, joining the series in the second season, commenting that "Park In-je joined us for season two, and the new system of ‘making a TV series with people who make films’ was fascinating. The intensity is definitely higher compared to filming a two-hour film, but the actors were allowed enough time and room to prepare for filming a season that amounts to six hours, so I had faith in the final outcome being of high quality."

In a press conference for Kingdom: Ashin of the North, Jun Ji-hyun revealed her experience of joining the series. The actress stated that "I was a huge fan of Kingdom. When I met with the writer [Kim Eun-hee] in a private setting before I was offered the role, I told her I was willing to even appear as a zombie in Kingdom. I am so thankful that she gave me such a big role." She later stated that after reading the screenplay for the special episode, "I was thrilled at the thought that I could start the big story."

Reception
The first season received critical acclaim from critics and the audience. The review aggregator website Rotten Tomatoes reported a 93% approval rating based on 14 reviews. The website's critical consensus reads, "An enthralling blend of blood, terror, and political intrigue, Kingdom is a refreshing addition to the zombie landscape." The series is praised by critics for its blend of the political thriller, historical drama and horror genres.

Aloysius Low of CNET praised the cinematography of the first season, stating that "shots cleverly linger on certain scenes to draw out the impressive sets, while adeptly tracking the action during sword fights or zombie attacks." Renaldo Matadeen from CBR mentioned in a positive review of the first season, that "Kingdom makes even bolder sociopolitical statements than The Walking Dead does. Sure, the AMC series waxes on about class and elitism, but Kingdom wades deep into governance and the divide between the rulers and the suffering populace." Jonathan Christian from The Playlist complimented the series by adding that "this series is risky programming for people who appreciate the unusual, gory, but imaginative, things in life. Considering the over-saturated state of the market, it is refreshing to see Netflix taking chances." Joel Keller from News AU recommended the first season in their review of the series by stating that "Kingdom dares to show that zombies aren't just a 20th and 21st-century phenomenon, and we applaud that kind of creative storytelling."

While reviewing the first season, Kate Sanchez from But Why Tho? declared in a positive review that "Kingdom offers a period drama, a zombie show, and a tense atmosphere that will keep you watching until you're done with this season. In an over-saturated sub-genre, this show takes common horror tropes and rewrites zombie rules for Joseon Korea in a way that reinvigorates my love of the sub-genre." Michael Pementel from Bloody Disgusting praised the series, stating that "Kingdom is by far one of the most compelling works to come out of the zombie genre" and further adding that "thanks to strong acting, gripping action and drama, gruesome visuals, and an overall powerful narrative, Kingdom is a must watch for horror fans."

On Rotten Tomatoes, the second season reported a 100% rating based on 8 reviews.

In a positive review of the second season, Jorge Loser from Espinof wrote that, "Kingdom avoids unnecessary fillers in the story, and leaves a consistency in its spine that makes it worthy." Sol Harris from Starburst praised the second season, stating that it is "a true roller-coaster of a thrill-ride, balancing nail-biting zombie carnage with the sword-based military action of countless samurai movies with a handful of darkly comedic moments that would make Sam Raimi proud." Kevin Lever of Tell-Tale TV gave the second season a very positive review, writing: "the most important thing about Kingdom remains absolutely, undeniably riveting. The political intrigue is certainly exciting when the outbreak is its backdrop, the future of the country at risk when leadership is most needed." He said further that the season, "continues the greatness of the first season and delivers a satisfying, bloody good time." Rafael Motamayor from GameSpot recommended the second season in his review by highlighting that, "Not to be outdone by Game of Thrones, Kingdom also serves as an intriguing courtroom thriller", further praising the narrative, by adding that it "doubles down on the viral aspect of the zombie outbreak, exploring its natural origin, how it spreads, and most frighteningly, how it evolves."

The New York Times named Kingdom one of "The Best International Shows of 2020." Following Netflix's reporting on the considerable success that Kingdom obtained globally after it was made available to stream on their platform service, Eun-hee stated in response that "I could never have imagined the popularity [Kingdom got]. I did my best to make it as Korean as possible because I wanted people to see it and become more curious about Korea."

Release
On December 17, 2018, the official trailer for the series was released. On January 25, 2019, the first season of the series, consisting of six episodes, was released for streaming on Netflix. The second season, also consisting of six episodes, was released on March 13, 2020. A special 92-minute episode, titled "Kingdom: Ashin of the North", was released on July 23, 2021. A second special episode on the Crown Prince is reported to be in the works and scheduled for release in 2023.

Awards and nominations

Notes

References

External links
 
 
 Kingdom (season 1)  at AStory
 Kingdom (season 2)  at AStory
 

2019 South Korean television series debuts
2010s South Korean television series
2020s South Korean television series
South Korean web series
Alternate history television series
Cannibalism in fiction
Korean-language Netflix original programming
Period television series
Political television series
Serial drama television series
South Korean fantasy television series
South Korean horror fiction television series
South Korean pre-produced television series
South Korean thriller television series
Television shows written by Kim Eun-hee
Television series by AStory
Television series set in the Joseon dynasty
Television shows based on South Korean webtoons
Zombies in television